Elie Brun (born 15 October 1948 in Périgueux) is a former member of the Senate of France, who represented the Var department from 2008 to 2010. He is a member of the Union for a Popular Movement.

References
Page on the Senate website 

People from Périgueux
1948 births
Living people
Union for a Popular Movement politicians
French Senators of the Fifth Republic
Senators of Var (department)
21st-century French politicians